"Young Again" is a song by Dutch DJ Hardwell. It features singer Chris Jones. It is the second single from Hardwell's 2015 debut studio album United We Are.

Background 
A music video for the song was released.

Track listing

Charts

References 

2015 songs
2015 singles
Hardwell songs
Songs written by Hardwell